The Department for Business, Energy and Industrial Strategy (BEIS) was a department of His Majesty's Government. 

The department was formed during a machinery of government change on 14 July 2016, following Theresa May's appointment as Prime Minister, through a merger between the Department for Business, Innovation and Skills (BIS) and the Department of Energy and Climate Change (DECC). 

On 7 February 2023, the department was dissolved. Its functions were split into three new departments: the Department for Business and Trade, the Department for Energy Security and Net Zero, and the Department for Science, Innovation and Technology. Grant Shapps, the final secretary of state for the old department became the first Secretary of State for Energy Security and Net Zero.

Responsibilities
The department had responsibility for:

 business
 industrial strategy
 science, research and innovation
 deregulation
 energy and clean growth
 climate change

While some functions of the former Department for Business, Innovation and Skills, in respect of higher and further education policy, apprenticeships and skills, were transferred to the Department for Education, in a statement May explained:The Department for Energy and Climate Change and the remaining functions of the Department for Business, Innovation and Skills have been merged to form a new Department for Business, Energy and Industrial Strategy, bringing together responsibility for business, industrial strategy, and science and innovation with energy and climate change policy. The new department will be responsible for helping to ensure that the economy grows strongly in all parts of the country, based on a robust industrial strategy. It will ensure that the UK has energy supplies that are reliable, affordable and clean; and it will make the most of the economic opportunities of new technologies, and support the UK's global competitiveness more effectively.

Research and innovation partnerships in low and middle-income countries
BEIS spends part of the overseas aid budget on research and innovation through two major initiatives: The Newton Fund and the Global Challenges Research Fund, or GCRF. Both funds aim to leverage the UK's world-class research and innovation capacity to pioneer new ways to support economic development, social welfare and long-term sustainable and equitable growth in low and middle-income countries. The Newton Fund builds research and innovation partnerships with partner countries to support their economic development and social welfare, and to develop their research and innovation capacity for long-term sustainable growth. The fund is delivered through seven UK delivery partners.

National Security and Investment Act 2021
In August 2022, BEIS blocked the sale of Pulsic Limited in Bristol to a company owned by the China's National Integrated Circuit Industry Investment Fund. Pulsic is a chip design software company which makes tools to design and develop the circuit layouts for chips.

In November 2022, BEIS ordered Nexperia to sell at least 86 percent of Newport Wafer Fab, the largest chipmaking facility in the UK, which it had acquired in July 2021. Nexperia itself had been taken over by a Chinese company named Wingtech Technology in 2018.

Devolution
Some responsibilities extend to England alone due to devolution, while others are reserved or excepted matters that therefore apply to the other countries of the United Kingdom as well.

Reserved and excepted matters are outlined below.

Scotland

Reserved matters:

The Economy Directorates of the Scottish Government handles devolved economic policy.

Northern Ireland

Reserved matters:
Climate change policy
Competition
Consumer protection
Import and export control
Export licensing
Intellectual property
Nuclear energy
Postal services
Product standards, safety and liability
Research councils
Science and research
Telecommunications
Units of measurement

Excepted matter:

Outer space
Nuclear power
The department's main counterpart is:
Department for the Economy (general economic policy)

Ministers
The final roster of ministers in the Department for Business, Energy and Industrial Strategy were:

In October 2016, Archie Norman was appointed as Lead Non-Executive Board Member for BEIS.

References

 
Business, Energy and Industrial Strategy
2016 establishments in the United Kingdom
Business in the United Kingdom
Economy ministries
Energy ministries
Innovation ministries
Research ministries
Energy in the United Kingdom
Innovation in the United Kingdom
Ministries established in 2016
2023 disestablishments in the United Kingdom
Government agencies disestablished in the 2020s